Anandapur is a town in Kendujhar district, India.

Anandapur may also refer to:

Anandapur, Bangladesh, a village in Chandpur District
Anandapur, Bankura, a village in Bankura I Sub District, India
Anandapur, Paschim Medinipur, a village in Paschim Medinipur district, India
Anandapur, Kolkata, a neighbourhood in Kolkata, India
Anandapur, a fictional kingdom in Disney's Animal Kingdom

See also
Anandpur (disambiguation)